Secret Agent X was the title of a U.S. pulp magazine published by A. A. Wyn's Ace Magazines, and the name of the main character featured in the magazine. The magazine ran for 41 issues between February 1934 and March 1939.

The Secret Agent X stories were written by more than one author, but they all appeared under the "house name" of Brant House. The first Secret Agent X story, The Torture Trust was written by Paul Chadwick, d. 1971, who went on to write at least fifteen others. Later stories were produced by G. T. Fleming-Roberts (born George Thomas Roberts, 1910-1968), Emile C. Tepperman (1899-1951) and Wayne Rogers (pen name of Archibald Bittner (1897-1966).

Character
In the stories, the true identity of Secret Agent X is never revealed. He is a master of disguise, known as "the man of a thousand faces", who adopts several different identities in each story. Although he is a dedicated crime-fighter working undercover for the U.S. government, this is unknown to the police who consider him an outlaw. His true role is known only to newspaper reporter Betty Dale and his mysterious Washington controller, K-9. Agent X come close to being undone once by a woman who could recognise him no matter what his disguise. She turned out to be blind and recognised his manner of walking.

Originally X was bank-rolled by an anonymous group of millionaires who made any amount of money he might need available. He maintained a number of identities and had bank-rolled a failing detective business into a thriving business where alongside their usual work, they did work for him, gathering news reports, getting information, leg work, guarding people, etc. They did not know his real identity. Later X became more of a mysterious government figure. His weapon of choice was a gas gun which quickly rendered people unconscious for a short time without any side effects.

Although ostensibly in the crime genre, the Secret Agent X stories were situated at the more far-fetched end of the spectrum, with a number of science fiction elements such as futuristic weapons and mad scientists. They were generally given highly sensational titles such as The Ambassador of Doom (May 1934), Servants of the Skull (November 1934), The Golden Ghoul (July 1935), Satan’s Syndicate (August 1937) and Curse of the Crimson Horde (September 1938).   There were a number of similarities between Secret Agent X and other pulp heroes of the time such as The Shadow, the Green Lama and Operator No. 5. Authors such as Tepperman and Rogers produced stories for Operator No. 5 magazine as well as for Secret Agent X.

Ace Comics also published a short-lived character based on Secret Agent X, but called him "X- The Phantom Fed". All stories were based on early novels.

Stories

 The Torture Trust, 02/01/34  01/1 - Paul Chadwick
 The Spectral Stranglers, 03/01/34 - Paul Chadwick
 The Death-Torch Terror, 04/01/34 - Paul Chadwick
 The Ambassador of Doom, 05/01/34 - Paul Chadwick
 City of Living Dead, 06/01/34 - Emile C. Tepperman  
 Octopus of Crime, 09/01/34 - Paul Chadwick
 The Hooded Hordes, 10/01/34 - Paul Chadwick
 Hand of Horror, 08/01/34  - Emile C Tepperman
 Servants of the Skull, 11/01/34 - Emile C Tepperman
 The Murder Monster, 12/01/34 - Emile C Tepperman
 Talons of Terror, 04/01/35 - Emile C Tepperman
 Sinister Scourge, 01/01/35 - Paul Chadwick
 Curse of the Waiting Death, 02/01/35 - Paul Chadwick
 Devils of Darkness, 03/01/35 - Paul Chadwick
 The Corpse Cavalcade, 05/01/35 - G. T. Fleming-Roberts
 The Golden Ghoul, 07/01/35 - G. T. Fleming-Roberts
 The Monarch of Murder, 08/01/35 - Paul Chadwick
 Legion of the Living Dead, 09/01/35 - Paul Chadwick
 Horde of the Damned, 10/01/35 - Paul Chadwick
 Ringmaster of Doom, 11/01/35 - G. T. Fleming-Roberts
 Kingdom of Blue Corpses, 12/01/35 - Paul Chadwick?
 Brand of the Metal Maiden, 01/01/36 - G. T. Fleming-Roberts
 Dividends of Doom, 02/01/36 - G. T. Fleming-Roberts
 The Fear Merchants, 03/01/36 - Paul Chadwick
 Faceless Fury, 04/01/36 - G. T. Fleming-Roberts
 Subterranean Scourge, 06/01/36 - G. T. Fleming-Roberts
 The Doom Director, 08/01/36 - G. T. Fleming-Roberts
 Horror's Handclasp, 10/01/36 - G. T. Fleming-Roberts
 City of Madness, 12/01/36 - G. T. Fleming-Roberts
 Death's Frozen Formula, 02/01/37 - G. T. Fleming-Roberts
 The Murder Brain, 04/01/37 - G. T. Fleming-Roberts
 Slaves of the Scorpion, 06/01/37 - G. T. Fleming-Roberts
 Satan's Syndicate, 08/01/37 - G. T. Fleming-Roberts
 The Assassin's League, 10/01/37 - G. T. Fleming-Roberts
 Plague of the Golden Death, 12/01/37 - G. T. Fleming-Roberts
 Curse of the Mandarin's Fan, 02/01/38 - G. T. Fleming-Roberts
 Claws of the Corpse Cult, 04/01/38 - G. T. Fleming-Roberts
 The Corpse that Murdered, 06/01/38 - G. T. Fleming-Roberts
 Curse of the Crimson Horde, 09/01/38 - Paul Chadwick
 Corpse Contraband, 12/01/38 - G. T. Fleming-Roberts
 Yoke of the Crimson Coterie, 03/01/39 - G. T. Fleming-Roberts

Reprints & new stories
Several Secret Agent X novels have been reprinted over the years. In the 1960s, at the height of the camp craze and the success of the Doc Savage reprints, Corinth Press (an imprint of soft porn publisher Regency) issued seven Secret Agent X adventures in paperback. Their low distribution made them collector's items almost from the very first, but didn't generate enough sales to continue the series. Since then, several other small presses have reprinted different stories. Small press Altus Press has begun an ambitious reprinting of the entire Secret Agent "X" series in nine volumes.   All nine volumes have appeared.

Beginning in 1996 Secret Agent X became the latest in a series of pulp heroes to be revived. In Tom Johnson's short story "Horror's Monster", published in Classic Pulp Fiction Stories #9, Agent X's saga moved into the early days of World War II. Here he squared off against criminals who employed giant spiders to achieve their nefarious ends. Since publication of Johnson's tale, Stephen Payne has penned three novels starring the Secret Agent: The Freezing Fiends (CPFS #12-17), Master of Madness (Double Danger Tales #1-3), and Halo of Horror (Double Danger Tales #21-23), all appearing under the aegis of Tom Johnson's Fading Shadows books. Halo of Horror and Master of Madness has since been reprinted in a pulp facsimile format by Altus Press. 

Altus Press has also published other Secret Agent X material: The Stolen Formula,  a rewrite of a Secret Agent X story written specifically for the Greek audience and published in their "magazine" Triple Detective #1, and reprinted The Secret Agent X Companion,  a comprehensive history of the character by Tom Johnson and Will Murray.

In addition, Wild Cat Books issued two collections of novellas showcasing the Agent; Secret Agent X Volumes 1 & 2. These were edited by pulp historian/writer, Ron Fortier and are currently Airship 27 Productions and published by Cornerstone Books Publisher. It is a continuing series of all new stories with future volumes in production. The third, fourth, and fifth volumes have already appeared, with Frank Schildiner's take on the hero as the cover tale.

Stephen Payne wrote a fourth new Secret Agent X novel, The Resurrection Ring, which revealed new facts about the origin of the Man of a Thousand Faces. It also starred some old friends and even an old enemy who had not been featured since the 1930s. Altus Press released it in Summer 2014, at Pulpfest. More recently, Payne has completed his fifth novel of the Secret Agent, League of the Seventh Son. Set in New Orleans in 1932, it showcases an adventure from before the Agent's recorded career, wherein the Man of a Thousand Faces battles the terrible Mister Seven, a variant of an ancient European legend. In addition it shows the specific reason that Agent X faked his own death, in order to become a nameless, faceless crime-buster. The novel was released in 2017. Payne is also writing his sixth novel, Agents of Apollyon. In this crossover tale set in 1938, X battles a 19th-century villain who has somehow survived to the 20th century. In the process the character has gained a deadly weapon with which he can bring the entire world to its knees. Payne will follow this novel with The Satan of the Sky, wherein the Agent faces an airborne menace in 1940 Phoenix. Future tales will include a pair of Cold War adventures: Fear's Flotilla and Time of the Terrible People. Also Payne is working on the outline for a story tentatively entitled Silence for Sale. In it the Man of a Thousand Faces will battle the Man of Silence, a weird villain who does not speak, but uses a form of sign language to communicate with his underlings.

Age of Adventure published a full-length Secret Agent X novel set during World War II, The Sea Wraiths by Sean Ellis. This has been reprinted by Retrograde Press recently.

See also
 Science fiction magazine
 Fantasy fiction magazine
 Horror fiction magazine

References

External links
Page with some Secret Agent X cover scans
Secret Agent X checklist 
Stephen Payne's Halo of Horror reissue
Triple Detective #1, which contains The Stolen Formula
Tom Johnson and Will Murray's The Secret Agent X Companion
Secret Agent “X” - The Complete Series Volume 1
 Download two Secret Agent X stories to read for free.
 Download a Secret Agent X story to read for free.

Pulp magazines
Characters in pulp fiction
Male characters in comics
Fictional secret agents and spies in comics
Magazines established in 1934
Magazines disestablished in 1939
Defunct science fiction magazines published in the United States